Matt Foreman is an American lesbian, gay, bisexual and transgender (LGBT) rights lawyer and activist with a rich background in political advocacy and civil rights work.  He is the program director at the Haas Jr. Fund, overseeing its work in the areas of gay and lesbian and immigrant rights.

Foreman was executive director of the NYC Gay & Lesbian Anti-Violence Project from 1990 to 1996 and the Empire State Pride Agenda from 1997 to 2003. He was executive director of the National Gay and Lesbian Task Force from May 2003 until 2008.

Foreman has also served in executive positions at the Empire State Pride Agenda and the New York City Gay and Lesbian Anti-Violence Project. While working at the Pride Agenda, he led campaigns that resulted in enactment of a statewide nondiscrimination law, a hate crimes law and several laws extending equal benefits to the surviving partners of those killed on 9/11. His leadership was also instrumental in the success of measures providing $15 million for LGBT health and human services in New York state. His tenure at the Anti-Violence project is remembered for focusing the city's attention on anti-gay violence, resulting in important changes in police training, deployment and responsiveness.

Prior to his work in the gay rights field, Foreman was involved in prison policy and administration for ten years, including service as assistant commissioner of the West Virginia Department of Corrections, executive assistant to the New York City correction commissioner, and director of a medium/minimum-security facility on Rikers Island.

A graduate of the New York University School of Law, Foreman is a founding member of Heritage of Pride, the group that currently organizes LGBT Pride events in New York City,  
and a former member of the New York City Human Rights Commission.

See also
Employment Non-Discrimination Act
Campaign to Defend the Constitution

References

External links
New York City Gay & Lesbian Anti-Violence Project
Empire State Pride Agenda
National Gay and Lesbian Task Force
Evelyn and Walter Haas, Jr. Fund
Metro Weekly interview

Living people
American LGBT rights activists
West Virginia Wesleyan College alumni
Activists from New York City
Year of birth missing (living people)